Heifer International (also known as Heifer Project International) is a global nonprofit working to eradicate poverty and hunger through sustainable, values-based holistic community development. Heifer International distributes animals, along with agricultural and values-based training, to families in need around the world as a means of providing self-sufficiency. Recipients must agree to "pass on the gift" by donating animal offspring, as well as sharing the skills and knowledge of animal husbandry and agricultural training with other impoverished families in the community. The organization receives financial support from the Bill & Melinda Gates Foundation, BlackRock, Cargill, Mastercard Foundation, Walmart and the W. K. Kellogg Foundation.

Based in Little Rock, Arkansas, United States, Heifer International started with a shipment of 17 heifers to Puerto Rico in 1944.

Origins and history  

Heifer International started as Heifers for Relief in 1944. Its founder, an Ohio farmer named Dan West, was a Church of the Brethren relief worker during the Spanish Civil War. Working with Quakers and Mennonites, West directed a program where hungry children were given rations of milk. In 1938, West was ladling out milk to hungry refugee children and wrote later that he thought, "These children don't need a cup [of milk], they need a cow."

When back home in Indiana, West took the idea to his neighbors and church. This led to the formation of the Heifers for Relief Committee in 1939. In 1942, West was approved by the U.S. Department of Agriculture to pursue the idea as a national project. The charity was incorporated in 1944 and sent its first shipment of 17 heifers to Puerto Rico. Several local farmers who knew West donated the animals.

The first cows were named, "Faith", "Hope", and "Charity", and recipient families had to promise that they would donate the first female calf to another poor family. West asked farmers and church leaders to donate pregnant dairy cows due to calve soon so that impoverished families could have milk for years to come and not have to worry about breeding the cows. Heifer International would eventually broaden its scope to distribute fish, chickens, pigs, goats, sheep, cattle, oxen, water buffaloes, bees, llamas, alpacas, camels, frogs and rabbits to poor rural communities around the world.

Heifer International's first paid employee was Thurl Metzger, a member of the Church of the Brethren who started as an unpaid volunteer and served as executive director/program director and director of international programs of Heifer International for 30 years. Metzger started his tenure as a seagoing cowboy. Seagoing cowboys volunteered to accompany the animals to their overseas destinations. From 1951 to 1981, Metzger served as the executive director and director of international programs of the nonprofit and diversified the program's offerings as well as the geographic regions Heifer International was serving. Eventually Metzger guided Heifer to work in developing nations instead of war-torn regions.

In the early 1970s, Heifer consolidated its U.S. distribution network by buying several large farms, including a 1,200-acre ranch in Perryville, Arkansas, as livestock holding facilities. The organization moved its headquarters to Little Rock, near the Perryville ranch, in 1971. Livestock are now sourced from within country or regionally.

In 1992, Heifer International appointed Jo Luck to its helm as CEO. Jo Luck is a former member of Bill Clinton's Arkansas gubernatorial cabinet. Before serving as CEO and president, Luck was the director of international programs for Heifer International. Heifer International's budget boomed to almost $100 million under Jo Luck's leadership.

In 2008, the Bill & Melinda Gates Foundation awarded Heifer International a $42.5 million grant to help poor rural farmers in East Africa double their incomes by increasing their production of high quality raw milk to sell to dairies. In 2012, the foundation followed up with an additional $8.2 million.

In 2010, Pierre U. Ferrari was named CEO of Heifer International. Ferrari became president and CEO after Jo Luck's retirement.

In 2011 Heifer International has committed to help rebuild rural communities and to improve economic opportunities through livestock inputs and management in Haiti as part of the 2011 Clinton Global Initiative (CGI) Annual Meeting.

Passing on the Gift 
Passing on the Gift is part of Heifer International's charitable model. The nonprofit grounds all of its projects in its 12 Cornerstones of Just and Sustainable Development.

Passing on the gift allows families and individuals who have received animals to be donors themselves.
Accountability allows for organization at the grassroots level. Community members decide together what kind of animal and assistance they would like. They also set goals, plan appropriate strategies to achieve those goals, and evaluate their success. Participants take responsibility for making the most of the tools and training they receive.
Sharing and caring. Participants become donors themselves and contribute to a more unified community.
Sustainability and self-reliance. Heifer training tries to empower participants to take charge of their own success; each project has an exit strategy to prepare farmers for self-sufficiency.
Improved animal management. Project participants learn key essential aspects of animal husbandry. 
Nutrition and income are the rewards Heifer expects recipients to gain from their gift animal through the consumption and/or sale of animal products.
Gender and family focus encourages women and men to share in decision-making and community development.
Genuine need and justice. Ensures that those most in need are given priority in receiving animals and training.
Improving the environment includes such agroecological techniques as improving soil fertility with animal manure, promoting forestation, respecting and encouraging biodiversity, monitoring watershed conditions and minimizing erosion.
Full participation is expected within the groups that Heifer works with. 
Training and education include formal sessions as well as informal farm visits and demonstrations. Each project group decides on its own training needs and local people are involved as trainers. 
Spirituality is expressed in common values, common beliefs about the value and meaning of all life, a sense of connectedness to the earth, and a shared vision of the future.

External audits

Charity Navigator 
As of 2018, Charity Navigator scored Heifer International as a 3-star (out of four) charity with 84.71 points out of 100. Heifer International's financial performance was rated 2-star while its transparency and accountability was rated 4-star. Based on the income statement for financial year 2017, Charity Navigator showed Heifer's non-program expenses (for administration, fundraising, and liabilities) as accounting for 23.8%, and program expenses for 76.2% of its total expenses.

GiveWell 
GiveWell notes that while Heifer International is "commonly perceived as a way to 'give a cow to a poor family as a gift' ... this is in fact a donor illusion – donations support Heifer International's general 'agricultural assistance' activities." GiveWell delineates concerns about the efficacy of agricultural assistance programs in general, and, specifically, those that involve gifts of livestock, stating, in conclusion: "Neither Heifer's website nor its grant application have provided the kind of information needed to address these concerns."

Awards
In 1986, President Ronald Reagan recognized Heifer with the Volunteer Action Award and in 1990 President George H.W. Bush granted the organization the Presidential End Hunger Award.
 
In 2003, Heifer International was named one of Forbes magazine's top 10 charities.

Heifer International also received the 2004 Conrad N. Hilton Humanitarian Prize for its efforts to eliminate hunger and help communities become self-sustaining.  It was the first U.S.-based organization to win the $1-million award since 1997.

Heifer International received the 2006 and 2008 Social Capitalist award from Fast Company magazine.

In 2007, the Heifer International Headquarters building was named one of the American Institute of Architects Committee on the Environment Top Ten Green Projects.

In 2008, the Heifer International Headquarters building was named a National AIA (American Institute of Architects) Institute Honor Award Winner.

In 2010, Heifer International President Jo Luck was named a co-laureate of the World Food Prize with David Beckmann of Bread for the World.

In 2011 Heifer International has committed to help in Haiti as part of the 2011 Clinton Global Initiative

In 2012, Heifer received Kiwanis International World Service Medal.

Other 
The American Institute of Philanthropy gave Heifer International an "Open Book Credit" for making complete financial documentation available on request.

The Better Business Bureau's Wise Giving Alliance (WGA) reports that Heifer International meets all of its standards for charity accountability. The WGA found that Heifer International is truthful in its representations of how money is spent, does not allocate an excessive part of its budget for fundraising or administrative expenses and makes its financial statements readily available to the public.

See also 
Agroecology

References

External links 

International sustainability organizations
Church of the Brethren
Charities based in Arkansas
Development charities based in the United States
1944 establishments in Arkansas
Organizations established in 1944